Calliostoma monikae is a species of sea snail, a marine gastropod mollusk in the family Calliostomatidae.

Some authors place this taxon in the subgenus Calliostoma (Fautor) .

Description

Distribution
This species occurs in the Pacific Ocean off the Samoan Islands.

References

 Stratmann D. & Schwabe E. (2007). Description of a new Calliostoma species from Samoan Islands (Mollusca, Gastropoda: Calliostomatidae). Schriften zur Malakozoologie, 23: 25–29

External links

monikae
Gastropods described in 2007